The Caterpillar 345C L is a large hydraulic excavator manufactured by Caterpillar Inc. The 345C L, with 345 hp (257 kW) of net flywheel power, is classified as a large excavator by Caterpillar.  In Caterpillar's naming conventions, the last two digits indicate the excavator's weight in metric tonnes.  The 345C L is not named after its horsepower.  Rather, it is a coincidence that both use the number 345.  Caterpillar currently produces the 300 series, including the 345C L.

Specifications

Engine

Engine Model: Caterpillar C13 ACERT
Net Flywheel Power: 345 hp (257 kW)
Net Power (ISO 9249): 345 hp (257 kW)
Net Power (SAE J1349): 349 hp (257 kW)
Net Power (EEC 80/1269): 345 hp (257 kW)
Cylinders: 6

Weights
Operating Weight: 99,150 lb (44,970 kg)
Operating Weight (long undercarriage): 99,150 lb (44,970 kg)

Operating Specifications
Max Reach at Ground Level: 42.5 ft (13.0 m)
Max Digging Depth: 29.3 ft (8.9 m)
Max Bucket Capacity: 5 yd³ (3.8 m³)
Nominal bucket weight: 3,880 lb (1,760 kg)
Bucket digging force (Normal): 39,300 lbf (175 kN) (

In the Media
 "Episode 678: Auction Fever", Planet Money, January 22, 2016.

References

Caterpillar Inc. vehicles
Tracked vehicles
Excavators